The 1998 Bank of America robbery was a bank robbery of $1.6 million in cash at the Bank of America in 1 World Trade Center, in New York City, on January 14, 1998.

The robbery was plotted and executed by Ralph Guarino, an actor and petty criminal with connections to the DeCavalcante crime family.  Guarino received some intelligence from a WTC worker named Salvatore Calciano, who told him about the increased security that followed the 1993 World Trade Center bombing and would later give him his employee ID badge from a friend of Calciano. He also told Guarino when a Brink's armored truck would arrive to deliver money via elevator to the 11th floor of the North Tower (Tower One) of the WTC.

The two of them planned the robbery and recruited three other criminals to complete the actual robbery: Richie Gillette, 39, from Windsor Terrace, Brooklyn, as well as his friends Melvin Folk, 44, and Mike Reed, 34.

On Wednesday, January 14, 1998, a Brink's van pulled up to the World Trade Center at around 8:30 a.m. and began unloading some bags of money. Only Gillette wore a ski mask to make it more difficult for others to identify him. They successfully subdued the WTC employees and guards to steal the bags. They took a total of $1.6 million (worth $ million today). The robbers exited the WTC at 8:45 a.m.

In the aftermath of the robbery, Folk and Reed returned to their old neighborhoods and were quickly identified and captured. Gillette was questioned by security after boarding an Amtrak train but was not detained at the time. He was later found and arrested in Albuquerque, New Mexico, two days later, at 8:30 pm. January 16. The FBI did not believe the three had acted alone and began to search for a mastermind. Guarino had various ideas of how to get rid of the money but ultimately was unable to follow through on any plans before FBI agents came to arrest him at his Staten Island home. Following his arrest, Guarino agreed to become an FBI informant on the DeCavalcante mafia family.

See also

List of bank robbers and robberies

References

Sources
 

1998 crimes in the United States
1998 in New York City
1990s crimes in New York City
1990s in Manhattan
1998 robbery
Bank robberies
Crimes in Manhattan
DeCavalcante crime family
American Mafia events
Organized crime events in the United States
Robberies in the United States
World Trade Center
January 1998 crimes
January 1998 events in the United States